The 2019 Turkish Super Cup (Turkish: TFF Süper Kupa) was the 46th edition of the Turkish Super Cup since its establishment as Presidential Cup in 1966, the annual Turkish football season-opening match contested by the winners of the previous season's top league and cup competitions (or cup runner-up in case the league- and cup-winning club is the same). It was played on 7 August 2019 between the champions of the 2018–19 Süper Lig and 2018–19 Turkish Cup, Galatasaray, and the runner-up of the 2018–19 Turkish Cup, Akhisarspor. The venue was the Eryaman Stadium in Ankara.

Match

Details

References

 

2019
Super Cup
Turkish Super Cup
2019
Galatasaray S.K. (football) matches
Akhisarspor matches